GEMoaB is a biopharmaceutical company based in Dresden/Germany. The company has a broad pipeline of next generation immunotherapy product candidates for the treatment of advanced blood cancers and solid tumours in pre-clinical and clinical development. The company was founded in 2011 by the two university professors Gerhard Ehninger and Michael Bachmann.

Company background 

To overcome the limitations of current cellular immunotherapies, GEMoaB has established two cellular immunotherapy platforms, which are called UniCAR & RevCAR. These genetically modified T-cells can be rapidly and repeatedly turned on and off via dosing of so-called Targeting Modules (TMs), which crosslink UniCAR/RevCAR T-effector cells with malignant target cells. Upon cross-linkage, UniCAR/RevCAR T-cells are activated and expanded and eliminate malignant target cells. They can be rapidly turned off after TM withdrawal, promising to avoid T-effector cell exhaustion and to reduce potential side effects typically associated with CAR-T therapies.

Scientific and strategic board 

The company's scientific and strategic board is composed of: Gerhard Ehninger (Chairman), Michael Bachmann (Germany), Katy Rezvani (U.S.A.), Bob Löwenberg (The Netherlands) as well as Thomas de Maizière, Member of Parliament (Germany).

Co-operations 

Gemoab co-operates with a range of partners: its sister company Cellex in Cologne, Germany, the Fraunhofer-Institut, the pharmaceutical company Bristol-Myers Squibb as well as the companies ABX, Bio Elpida and the federal Saxonian Ministry of Science and Research.

Drugs currently under development 
 GEM333: T-cell engaging bispecific antibody (TCE) against CD33 in AML
 GEM3PSCA, TCE against PSCA in Prostate Cancer and other PSCA expressing solid tumours
 UniCAR-T-CD 123 for the treatment of AML, ALL and certain lymphomas
 UniCAR-T-PSMA for the treatment of a number of PSMA expressing tumours

Literatur 
 Nicola Mitwasi et al.: "UniCAR"-modified off-the-shelf NK-92 cells for targeting of GD2-expressing tumour cells In:  Nature Scientific Reports, Band 10, 2020, S. 2141. , .
 Loff, S., Meyer, J.-E., Dietrich, J., Spehr, J., Julia, R., von Bonin, M., Gründer, C., Franke, K., Feldmann, A., Bachmann, M., Ehninger, G., Ehninger, A., Cartellieri, M.: Late-Stage Preclinical Characterization of Switchable CD123-Specific CAR-T for Treatment of Acute Leukemia In: Blood, 132, 2018, S. 964-964. .
 Arndt, C., Feldmann, A., Koristka, S., Schafer, M., Bergmann, R., Mitwasi, N., Berndt, N., Bachmann, D., Kegler, A., Schmitz, M., Puentes-Cala, E., Soto, J.A., Ehninger, G., Pietzsch, J., Liolios, C., Wunderlich, G., Kotzerke, J., Kopka, K., Bachmann, M.: A theranostic PSMA ligand for PET imaging and retargeting of T cells expressing the universal chimeric antigen receptor UniCAR In: Oncoimmunology, Band 8, 2019, Article: 1659095. , .
 C. Arndt, M. von Bonin et al.: Redirection of T cells with a first fully humanized bispecific CD33-CD3 antibody efficiently eliminates AML blasts without harming hematopoietic stem cells. In: Leukemia, Band 27, Nummer 4, April 2013, S. 964–967, .

See also 
 Gene therapy
 DKMS

References

External links 
 

Biotechnology companies of Germany
Pharmaceutical companies established in 2011
Biotechnology companies established in 2011